Anna Haak (born 12 September 1996) is a Swedish volleyball player, who plays as an outside for the French club ASPTT Mulhouse and the Swedish national team.

Club career 
Anna Haak was a part of her hometown's local volleyball team, Engelhoms VS, for at least three years, from 2012 to 2015. In the 2014–2015 season, Engelhoms VS won 1st Place.

While playing for the University of Miami, she tallied 3.21 kills per set and 2.36 digs per game.

International career

In 2014, Haak helped Sweden to a gold medal at the NEVZA U19 tournament and earned a spot on the all-tournament team. With the Haak, Sweden won Gold at the 2018 Women's Silver European Volleyball League. In 2021, Sweden reached the Quarter-finals at the European Championship.

Personal life
Haak was born in Perstorp but she later moved to Ängelholm shortly after her father had died from stomach cancer when she was 12 years old. Her younger sister Isabelle is also a national volleyball player and was her teammate during her time in Engelholms VS.

Awards

Individuals
 2015 Angelholms Gymnasieskola Idrottskolden "Sports Performance of the Year"

National team

Junior team
 2014 U19 NEVZA Championship -  Gold Medal

Senior team
 2018 Women's Silver European Volleyball League -  Gold Medal

References 

1996 births
Living people
Swedish women's volleyball players
Swedish expatriate sportspeople in France
People from Perstorp Municipality
Sportspeople from Skåne County